Route 127 is a  north–south Massachusetts state route that runs from Beverly to Gloucester. Much of the northern part of the route is in Cape Ann. Route 127's southern terminus is at Route 1A and the southern terminus of Route 22 in Beverly and the northern terminus is at Route 128 in Gloucester.

Route description
Route 127 begins in Beverly concurrently with Route 22 at Route 1A, just north of the Veteran's Memorial Bridge. Shortly afterward, the two routes split, with Route 127 heading east towards the shore, following past Independence Park and Lyons Park overlooking Beverly Harbor. Route 127 passes the eastern end of Route 62 before turning eastward again. Route 127 passes Endicott College and the Prides Crossing and Beverly Farms MBTA stations before continuing eastward into Manchester-by-the-Sea.

Once in Manchester-by-the-Sea, Route 127 acts as the main route through town, passing the downtown area and just north of the Manchester station. It crosses the tracks one more time (next to Sweeney Park) as it heads into Gloucester. Once in Gloucester, the route passes the Magnolia section of town before passing Ravenswood Park and Stage Fort Park, site of a large marker commemorating the city's founding. Just before crossing Blynman Canal, Route 127 meets the end of Route 133. As it passes the Western Harbor, Route 127 passes the Gloucester Fisherman's Memorial as well as passing just north of several of the city's major fishing companies (including Gorton's of Gloucester).
Just north of the Inner Harbor of Gloucester, Route 127 meets the southern end of Route 127A, just before crossing near the northern end of Route 128. Route 127 then crosses into the town of Rockport. The route passes towards the downtown, meeting the northern end of Route 127A and passing the Rockport station. Route 127 then heads north near the shore, passing Gull Cove, Rowe's Cove, Pigeon Cove and Ocean View, before bending southward (contrary to its signage) at Halibut Point State Park. It then re-enters Gloucester, changing direction on its state route signs, heading southward along Rowley Shore and along the banks of the Annisquam and Mill Rivers before finally ending at Route 128, at Grant Circle.

Overall, it is noted for being a scenic road with a good view along much of Essex County’s coast.

North Shore Route 127 in Beverly was named as one of the 1,000 places to visit in Massachusetts by the Great Places in Massachusetts Commission.

History 
Route 127's route in 1930 was almost identical to the current route. However, it originally continued south of Grant Circle to end at itself. It was cut back in the mid-1990s.

Major intersections

Route 127A 

Route 127A is a north–south Massachusetts state route that runs from Gloucester to Rockport. All of the route is in Cape Ann, and it serves as a coastal alternative to Route 127.

The route starts in Gloucester where Route 127 leaves East Main Street and turns north to become Eastern Avenue. Route 127A continues east as East Main Street for about 500 feet before meeting the northern terminus of Route 128. Here, Route 127A takes the name of Bass Avenue, which it retains for half a mile before coming to an intersection with Atlantic and Thatcher Roads. At this point, Route 127A turns north onto Thatcher Road, bending northeast and east again, while passing Good Harbor Beach. After passing the beach entrance, the road begins to bend in a northeasterly direction as it crosses the town line into Rockport, keeping the name of Thatcher Road. After 1.6 miles in Rockport, the route comes to an intersection with South Street. Route 127A veers northwards onto South Street, eventually bending to the west. At Prospect Street, the road takes the name of Mt. Pleasant Street and heads northwest to downtown Rockport. As it approaches downtown, passing part of Rockport Harbor, Route 127A turns southwest onto Broadway and abruptly heads away from downtown Rockport. Finally, Route 127A terminates at an intersection with Route 127. Route 127A was commissioned in the early 1950s.

References

127